Ou Dambang Muoy is a khum (commune) of Sangkae District in Battambang Province in north-western Cambodia.

Villages

 Voat Ta Moem
 Baoh Pou
 Ou Khcheay
 Ou Sralau
 Voat Chaeng
 Samraong Kaong

References

Communes of Battambang province
Sangkae District